Robert McConville (born 22 August 1964) was a Scottish footballer who played for Kilmarnock, East Stirlingshire, Stirling Albion, Dumbarton and Albion Rovers.

References

1964 births
Scottish footballers
Dumbarton F.C. players
Kilmarnock F.C. players
East Stirlingshire F.C. players
Albion Rovers F.C. players
Stirling Albion F.C. players
Scottish Football League players
Living people
Association football midfielders